Kevin Carl Shaffer (born March 2, 1980) is a former American football offensive tackle. He was drafted by the Atlanta Falcons in the seventh round of the 2002 NFL Draft. He played college football at Tulsa.

Shaffer also played for the Cleveland Browns and Chicago Bears.

Early years
He attended Conestoga Valley High School and as a senior he made 33 tackles at the defensive tackle position.

College career
Shaffer played college football at the University of Tulsa where he majored in finance.

Professional career

Atlanta Falcons
Shaffer was selected by the Atlanta Falcons in the seventh round (244th overall) in the 2002 NFL Draft. In his rookie season he played in six regular season games, plus two postseason games. He made his NFL debut at the Green Bay Packers on September 8. In the 2003 season he played in all 16 games and made his first NFL start at the New York Giants on November 9. In his third season for the Falcons, Shaffer started in 15 games and was a member of the offensive line that ranked first in the NFL with 2,672 rushing yards. Just as he did the previous season, he helped the offensive line become the highest ranked in terms of rushing yards with 159.1 yards per game. He started in all 16 regular season games.

Cleveland Browns
Shaffer signed with the Cleveland Browns as un unrestricted free agent on March 11, 2006. He started in all 16 regular season games and made his Browns debut versus the New Orleans Saints on September 10. In 2007, just as he had done the previous two seasons, Shaffer started in all 16 regular season games.

Shaffer was released by the Browns on March 12, 2009.

Chicago Bears
Shaffer agreed to terms on a three-year, $8 million contract with the Chicago Bears on March 25, 2009.

On February 28, 2011, the Bears released Shaffer.

References

External links
Chicago Bears bio

1980 births
Living people
People from Salisbury, Maryland
American football offensive tackles
Tulsa Golden Hurricane football players
Atlanta Falcons players
Cleveland Browns players
Chicago Bears players
Conestoga Valley High School alumni